Charles Moore (1804 – 15 August 1869) was an Irish politician. He served in the British Parliament from 1865 to 1869 as Member of Parliament (MP) for Tipperary.

Biography
Charles Moore was born 17 June 1804 to Arthur and Mary O'Hara Moore of Crookedstone, County Antrim. He was a partner in the Liverpool merchant firm of Moore Brothers and Company.

He purchased Mooresfort in County Tipperary around 1852 and substantially remodelled the house, reducing it from a three stories to two. He was J.P. for that county. 
Moore's only known speech in the House of Commons was in a debate on the Habeas Corpus Suspension Bill.

He died 15 August 1869 at his home in Grafton Street.

Family 
On 12 January 1835 he married Marian Elizabeth Story of Liverpool. Their children were:
 Henry O'Hara
 Arthur John
 Marian Edith
 Helena Blanche, became a nun
 Laura Mary, married George Augustus Vaughn, partner in her father's firm, and nephew of John Vaughan, 3rd Earl of Lisburne

Arms

References

External links 
 

1804 births
1869 deaths
Members of the Parliament of the United Kingdom for County Tipperary constituencies (1801–1922)
UK MPs 1865–1868
UK MPs 1868–1874
19th-century Irish people